Reproductions is an album of cover versions of songs by The Human League, recorded by various artists. It was released in 7 November 2000 as a tribute to The Human League.

Track listing
 Stephin Merritt - "Get Carter"  00:29
 The Aluminum Group - "Love Action (I Believe in Love)" 04:09
 Optiganally Yours - "Empire State Human" 03:10
 Barcelona - "Mirror Man" 03:47
 Future Bible Heroes - "Don't You Want Me" 03:50
 Ladytron - "Open Your Heart" 04:08
 Baxendale - "(Keep Feeling) Fascination" 05:01
 Superheroes - "The Sound of the Crowd" 03:21
 Lali Puna - "Together in Electric Dreams" 04:32
 The Hidden Variable - "The Black Hit Of Space" 04:34
 Momus - "I Am The Law" 04:13
 Clicks - "Seconds" 04:57
 hollAnd - "The Lebanon" 01:35
 Stars - "Stay With Me Tonight" 05:39
 Garlands - "Being Boiled" 03:01
 The 6ths, Lloyd Cole and the Commotions - "Human" 03:19

Reception

See also
 Together in Electric Dreams (EP)

References

The Human League tribute albums
2000 compilation albums